Big Band Holidays is a 2015 Christmas album by the Jazz at Lincoln Center Orchestra and Wynton Marsalis, released on October 30, 2015 by Blue Engine Records.

Track listing
 Jingle Bells
 Have Yourself a Merry Little Christmas feat. Cécile McLorin Salvant
 White Christmas
 ’Zat You, Santa Claus? feat. René Marie
 A Cradle in Bethlehem feat. Gregory Porter
 We Three Kings
 What Child Is This? feat. Cécile McLorin Salvant
 Merry Christmas Baby feat. Gregory Porter
 It’s Easy to Blame the Weather feat. Cécile McLorin Salvant
 I’ll Be Home for Christmas feat. René Marie
 Good Morning Blues feat. Cécile McLorin Salvant
 Band Introductions

References

External links
 Jazz at Lincoln Center Celebrates 'Big Band Holidays', NPR

2015 Christmas albums
Big band albums
Christmas albums by American artists
Swing Christmas albums
Wynton Marsalis albums